Partido Demócrata Popular may refer to:

 Popular Democratic Party (Dominican Republic)
 People's Democratic Party (Spain) (1982-89)
 People's Democratic Party (Spain) (1974-77)